Samuel Felton Posey (born May 26, 1944) is an American former racing driver and sports broadcast journalist.

Early life and driving career
Posey's father was killed in the Battle of Okinawa. Posey grew up on his grandfather's Connecticut estate near Lime Rock Park. Posey was bought a Mercedes-Benz 300 SL when he was 14 years old, and practiced driving the car around his family farm. He received his first racing lessons from neighbor John Fitch. Sam Posey started as an amateur sports car racer, and graduated to the Can-Am, in a car designed and funded by himself in collaboration with engineer friend Ray Caldwell. Posey raced the Sunoco Camaro for Roger Penske in 1968 in the Trans-Am Series. Chevrolet won the championship based on the Penske team effort. Mark Donohue was the lead driver and he won a remarkable 10 of 13 races. Posey's first race was at Bridgehampton  where he finished 3rd. Other finishes were: Meadowdale, 3rd’; St Jovite, 3rd; Bryar, 6th; Watkins Glen, 2nd which was the only race that Donohue was beaten by a Camaro in 1968. Posey's car was the same Sunoco Blue with yellow lettering as Donohue. Posey sported a yellow spoiler and Donohue had a red spoiler.

In 1969, he won the Lime Rock Trans-Am in a factory Ford Mustang. In 1970, Posey was the driver for Ray Caldwell's factory-backed Autodynamics Dodge Challenger in Trans-Am, racing against Parnelli Jones, Dan Gurney, Mark Donohue and Jim Hall in what most racing historians regard as the greatest season of professional road racing in US history. Posey also raced in the USAC Championship Car series in the 1969 and 1972-1974 seasons, with 13 career starts, including the 1972 Indianapolis 500. Posey's entry was disqualified from the 1973 Indianapolis 500 after it was discovered that his team had disguised his already qualified car as another vehicle so that he could make another qualifying attempt to try to avoid being bumped from the field. He finished in the top ten 8 times, with his best finish in 3rd position in 1969 at the Kent road course. He was the team driver for Caldwell's Can-Am racer which featured monocoque aluminum construction in two parallel longitudinal space frames, with solid front and rear axles.

As an endurance racer, Posey appeared at the 24 Hours of Le Mans 10 times (1966, 1969–1973, and 1975–1978) and finished in the top 10 five times. His best finish was 3rd position during the 1971 competition in which he drove the Ferrari 512M. He won the 1975 12 Hours of Sebring, teaming with three other drivers.

He participated in two Formula One world championship events, the 1971 and 1972 United States Grand Prix, retiring from the first and finishing 12th in the second, thus not scoring any championship points. He drove Surtees cars on both occasions, but only the first was a works-entered car.

He also competed in a single event in the NASCAR Grand National Series (now known as the NASCAR Cup Series), the first race of the 1970 season, held on the Riverside International Raceway road course in Riverside, California.

Racing analyst
Posey went on to become an auto racing commentator for ABC Sports. Posey debuted on ABC for the Indianapolis 500 in 1974, serving as analyst. In subsequent years, he served as a pit reporter, and ultimately returned to the booth starting in 1982.

While commentating the 1986 Indianapolis 500, as there was a yellow flag out very near the end of the race, Posey used a two-way radio to ask an impromptu question to race leader Kevin Cogan. Posey was trying to ask Cogan about his thoughts in leading the Indianapolis 500 at this stage. Cogan tried to stave off the conversation once, but Posey persisted a second time, at which time Cogan politely replied to Posey that he was "a little busy now," but would talk to him later. Posey understood the circumstances and told the audience if that were he, "I wouldn't want to talk to me either." Moments later, on a restart with two laps remaining, Bobby Rahal jumped Cogan on the restart and went on to win.

Along with the Indy 500, Posey's ABC Sports duties included commentary for the CART/PPG Indy Car World Series with Paul Page and Bobby Unser, lasting through 1995. Posey also appeared on selected NASCAR broadcasts on ABC. The three-man booth of Page, Posey, and Unser was a fixture of Indy car racing during the late 1980s and early 1990s. Posey and Bobby Unser were known to engage in friendly, but sometimes heated exchanges on-air. The friction reached a level such that beginning in 1993 at the Indy 500, Unser moved out of the booth and began reporting from a remote location in turn two.

In 1989, Posey was brought in as part of the ABC Sports broadcast team covering the 1989 Tour de France. Many people were surprised by Posey's knowledge and genuine enthusiasm for the sport. ABC would bring him back as the lead anchor for the 1990 and 1991 races.  Posey also worked as the play-by-play announcer for luge during ABC's coverage of the 1984 Winter Olympics in Sarajevo and the 1988 Winter Olympics in Calgary.

Recent years
Posey later moved to Speedvision (also known as Speed Channel). He currently does essay work for the coverage of the Tour de France on OLN (previously the Outdoor Life Network, next known as Versus, now known as NBC Sports) serving as the "Race Historian", and writes for Road & Track magazine.

Posey is also the author of Playing With Trains, a book on model railroading published by Random House and his layout (the Colorado Midland) was featured in the February 1995 issue of Model Railroader Magazine, and The Mudge Pond Express, an autobiography which centers around his personal racing career and love of the sport.

An accomplished artist, painter and architect, in 1966 he earned his B.F.A. in painting from Rhode Island School of Design. Since 1995, Posey suffers from Parkinson's disease, which has attenuated his activities in recent years.

Posey was the voice for the pre-race build-up montage slotted between the Mercedes-Benz Pre-Race Show and the actual race coverage for each Formula 1 race shown on the Speed Channel. Posey also comments on recent Formula 1 races and the championship in a segment called "Posey's Perspective" as part of the Formula 1 Debrief show (also featuring Bob Varsha, David Hobbs, Steve Matchett, and Will Buxton) on the Speed Channel. Posey narrated F1 montages for the NBC Sports Network from 2013 to 2017.

Awards

He was inducted into the Motorsports Hall of Fame of America in 2016.

Tribute

In 2013, the front straight at Lime Rock Park was renamed the Sam Posey Straight.

Complete Formula One World Championship results
(key)

Complete Indianapolis 500 results

Complete 24 Hours of Le Mans results

References

External links
 Sam Posey in the National Gallery of Australia's Kenneth Tyler Collection 

Living people
1944 births
People from Sharon, Connecticut
Racing drivers from New York City
Racing drivers from Connecticut
The Frederick Gunn School alumni
American Formula One drivers
Surtees Formula One drivers
Champ Car drivers
Indianapolis 500 drivers
Tasman Series drivers
24 Hours of Le Mans drivers
24 Hours of Daytona drivers
World Sportscar Championship drivers
NASCAR drivers
Trans-Am Series drivers
Motorsport announcers
Cycling announcers
Olympic Games broadcasters
People with Parkinson's disease
Rhode Island School of Design alumni
12 Hours of Sebring drivers
BMW M drivers